The 1998 Redbridge Council election took place on 7 May 1998 to elect members of Redbridge London Borough Council in London, England. The whole council was up for election and the council stayed in no overall control.

Background

Election result

Ward results

References

1998
1998 London Borough council elections